Annie Jump Cannon (December 11, 1863 – April 13, 1941) was an American astronomer whose cataloging work was instrumental in the development of contemporary stellar classification. With Edward C. Pickering, she is credited with the creation of the Harvard Classification Scheme, which was the first serious attempt to organize and classify stars based on their temperatures and spectral types. She developed the mnemonic "Oh! Be A Fine Girl — Kiss Me!" used by students to memorize the spectral classification of stars. She was nearly deaf throughout her career after 1893, as a result of scarlet fever. She was a suffragist and a member of the National Women's Party.

Personal life
Cannon was born on December 11, 1863, in Dover, Delaware. She was the eldest of three daughters born to Wilson Cannon, a Delaware shipbuilder and state senator, and his second wife, Mary Jump. Cannon's mother was the first person to teach her the constellations and she encouraged her to follow her own interests, suggesting that she pursue studies in mathematics, chemistry, and biology at Wellesley College. Cannon and her mother used an old astronomy textbook to identify stars seen from their attic. Cannon's mother also taught her daughter household economics, which Cannon would later use to organize her research.

Cannon took her mother's advice and pursued her love of astronomy. She lost most of her hearing sometime during her early adult years. Sources vary on the time frame and actual cause, although it is often attributed to scarlet fever. Cannon's personality has been described as "ebullient". She chose not to marry or have children.

Education, 1880–1896
At Wilmington Conference Academy (later known as Wesley College), Cannon was a promising student, particularly in mathematics. In 1880, Cannon was sent to Wellesley College in Massachusetts, one of the top academic schools for women in the US, where she studied physics and astronomy.

Cannon studied under Sarah Frances Whiting, one of the few women physicists in the United States at the time, and went on to become the valedictorian at Wellesley College. She graduated with a degree in physics in 1884 and returned home to Delaware for a decade.

During these years, Cannon developed her skills in the new art of photography. In 1892, she traveled through Europe taking photographs with her Blair box camera.  After she returned home her prose and photos from Spain were published in a pamphlet called "In the Footsteps of Columbus", published by the Blair Company and distributed as a souvenir at the Chicago World's Columbian Exposition of 1893.

Soon afterward, Cannon was stricken with scarlet fever that rendered her nearly deaf. This hearing loss made it difficult for Cannon to socialize. As a result, she immersed herself in her work. In 1894, Cannon's mother died and life at home grew more difficult. She wrote to her former instructor at Wellesley, professor Sarah Frances Whiting, to see if there was a job opening. Whiting hired her as a junior physics teacher at the college. This opportunity allowed Cannon to take graduate courses at the college in physics and astronomy. Whiting also inspired Cannon to learn about spectroscopy.

In order to gain access to a better telescope, Cannon enrolled at Radcliffe College as a "special student", continuing her studies of astronomy.  Radcliffe was set up near Harvard College for Harvard professors to repeat their lectures to the young Radcliffe women. This relationship gave Cannon access to the Harvard College Observatory.  In 1896, Edward C. Pickering hired her as his assistant at the Observatory. In 1907, Cannon finished her studies and received her master's degree from Wellesley College.

Career, 1896–1940

In 1896, Cannon became a member of the Harvard Computers, a group of women hired by Harvard Observatory director Edward C. Pickering to complete the Henry Draper Catalogue, with the goal of mapping and defining every star in the sky to a photographic magnitude of about 9. In her notes, she referred to brightness as "Int" which was short for "intensity". In 1927, Pickering said that she was able to classify stars very quickly, "Miss Cannon is the only person in the world—man or woman—who can do this work so quickly." Mary Anna Draper, the widow of wealthy physician and amateur astronomer Henry Draper, had set up a fund to support the work.  Men at the laboratory did the labor of operating the telescopes and taking photographs while the women examined the data, carried out astronomical calculations, and cataloged those photographs during the day.  Pickering made the Catalogue a long-term project to obtain the optical spectra of as many stars as possible and to index and classify stars by spectra.

In 1898, Cannon discovered her first star, though she was not able to confirm it until 1905. When she first started cataloging the stars, she was able to classify 1,000 stars in three years, but by 1913, she was able to work on 200 stars an hour. Cannon could classify three stars a minute just by looking at their spectral patterns and, if using a magnifying glass, could classify stars down to the ninth magnitude, around 16 times fainter than the human eye can see. Her work was also highly accurate.

Not long after work began on the Draper Catalogue, a disagreement developed as to how to classify the stars.  The analysis was first started by Nettie Farrar, who left a few months later to be married.  This left the problem to the ideas of Henry Draper's niece Antonia Maury (who insisted on a complex classification system) and Williamina Fleming (who was overseeing the project for Pickering, and wanted a much more simple, straightforward approach).  Cannon negotiated a compromise: she started by examining the bright southern hemisphere stars.  To these stars, she applied a third system, a division of stars into the spectral classes O, B, A, F, G, K, M.  Her scheme was based on the strength of the Balmer absorption lines.  After absorption lines were understood in terms of stellar temperatures, her initial classification system was rearranged to avoid having to update star catalogs. She developed the mnemonic "Oh! Be A Fine Girl — Kiss Me!" used by students to memorize the spectral classification of stars.

In 1901, Cannon published her first catalog of stellar spectra. 

Cannon and the other women at the observatory, including Henrietta Swan Leavitt, Antonia Maury, and Florence Cushman, were criticized at first for being "out of their place" and not being housewives. Women did not commonly rise beyond the level of assistant in this line of work at the time and many were paid only 25 cents an hour to work seven hours a day, six days a week. Leavitt, another woman in the observatory who made significant contributions, shared with Cannon the experience of being deaf. Cannon dominated this field because of her "tidiness" and patience for the tedious work and even helped the men in the observatory gain popularity. Cannon helped broker partnerships and exchanges of equipment between men in the international community and assumed an ambassador-like role outside of it.

In 1911 she was made the Curator of Astronomical Photographs at Harvard. In 1914, she was admitted as an honorary member of the Royal Astronomical Society. In 1921, she became one of the first women to receive an honorary doctorate from a European university when she was awarded an honorary doctor's degree in math and astronomy from Groningen University.

On May 9, 1922, the International Astronomical Union passed the resolution to formally adopt Cannon's stellar classification system; with only minor changes, it is still being used for classification today. Also in 1922, Cannon spent six months in Arequipa, Peru, to photograph stars in the Southern hemisphere.

In 1925, she became the first woman to receive an honorary doctorate of science from Oxford University. 

In 1933, she represented professional women at the World's Fair in Chicago (Century of Progress).In 1935, she created the Annie J. Cannon Prize for "the woman of any country, whose contributions to the science of astronomy are the most distinguished."

In 1938, she became the William C. Bond Astronomer at Harvard University.

The astronomer Cecilia Payne collaborated with Cannon and used Cannon's data to show that the stars were composed mainly of hydrogen and helium.

Later life and death, 1940–1941
Annie Jump Cannon's career in astronomy lasted for more than 40 years, until her retirement in 1940.  Despite her retirement, she continued to actively work on astronomy in the observatory up until a few weeks before she died. During her career, Cannon helped women gain acceptance and respect within the scientific community. Her calm and hardworking attitude and demeanor helped her gain respect throughout her lifetime and paved the path for future women astronomers.

Cannon died on April 13, 1941, in Cambridge, Massachusetts, at the age of 77. She died in a hospital after being ill for over a month. The American Astronomical Society presents the Annie Jump Cannon Award annually to female astronomers for distinguished work in astronomy.

Work
Cannon manually classified more stars in a lifetime than anyone else, with a total of around 350,000 stars.  She discovered 300 variable stars, five novas, and one spectroscopic binary, creating a bibliography that included about 200,000 references.

Awards and honors

 1921, honorary doctorate from the University of Groningen, the Netherlands
 1925, first woman recipient of an honorary doctorate from Oxford University
 1929, chosen as one of the "greatest living American women" by the League of Women Voters.
 1931, first woman to receive the Henry Draper Medal
 1932, won the Ellen Richards prize from the Association to Aid Scientific Research by Woman
 1935, received an honorary degree from Oglethorpe University
 First woman elected as officer of the American Astronomical Society
 The lunar crater Cannon is named after her.
 The asteroid 1120 Cannonia is named after her.
 Nicknamed "Census Taker of the Sky" for classifying 300,000 stellar bodies, more than any other person
 The Annie J. Cannon Award in Astronomy named in her honor; awarded since 1934 (now annually) to a woman astronomer in North America.
 Cannon Hall, a residence dormitory at the University of Delaware, named in her honor.
 The Annie Jump Cannon House, was the residence of the President of Wesley College in Dover, Delaware, before the college's acquisition by Delaware State University in July 2021.
 Named Curator of Astronomical Photographs at Harvard.
 Member of the Royal Astronomical Society in Europe.
 Honorary member of Phi Beta Kappa at Wellesley College
 Charter member of the Maria Mitchell Association
 She is among the list of women in the Heritage Floor as part of Judy Chicago's art installation The Dinner Party.
 1994, Cannon is inducted into the National Women's Hall of Fame
 In 2014, a Google Doodle honoring her and her work appeared.
 In 2019, she was depicted on Delaware's American Innovation $1 Coin.

Bibliography

Available in an "updated, corrected, and extended machine-readable version" at 

See also
Harvard Computers
Henry Draper Catalogue
"Sisters of the Sun", eighth episode of Cosmos: A Spacetime Odyssey, 2014 American science documentary television series

References

Sources

Further reading

External links 
 

 Annie Jump Cannon audio talk with colleagues from 365DaysOfAstronomy.Org
 Wellesley College Astronomy Department: Annie Jump Cannon from Wellesley College
 Bibliography on Women in Astronomy from the Astronomical Society of the Pacific
 Annie Jump Cannon: Theorist of Star Spectra, from the San Diego Supercomputer Center
 "In the footsteps of Columbus" by Annie Jump Cannon (souvenir photo book handed out at the 1893 Worlds Fair by the Blair Camera Company)
Google Doodle celebrating Annie Jump Cannon's 151st Birthday
Project Continua: Biography of Annie Jump Cannon Project Continua is a web-based multimedia resource dedicated to the creation and preservation of women's intellectual history from the earliest surviving evidence into the 21st Century.
 Papers of Annie Jump Cannon, 1863–1978 at Harvard University.
 Annie Jump Cannon Award in Astronomy at American Astronomical Society

1863 births
1941 deaths
20th-century American astronomers
20th-century American women scientists
American astrophysicists
American suffragists
American women academics
American women astronomers
American deaf people
Harvard Computers
Harvard University staff
People from Dover, Delaware
Radcliffe College alumni
Scientists with disabilities
Wellesley College alumni
Wellesley College faculty
Whitin Observatory
American women curators
American curators
Scientists from Delaware